State Route 52 (SR 52) is a  state highway that travels west to east through portions of Whitfield, Murray, Gilmer, Dawson, Lumpkin, Hall, Banks, and Jackson counties in the northern part of the U.S. state of Georgia. The highway extends from its western terminus at Interstate 75 (I-75) in Dalton to its eastern terminus at SR 98 in Maysville.

Route description

From its western terminus at exit 333 on I-75 in Dalton, SR 52 runs due east along Walnut Avenue into and through downtown Dalton in Whitfield County, curving northeast at Walnut Square Mall to come to its junction with US 76, where it becomes concurrent with US 76. The two routes continue east into Murray County and the northern parts of Chatsworth, where they briefly become co-signed with US 411/SR 2/SR 61, and all five routes travel south into downtown Chatsworth, where SR 52 and SR 2 depart and together continue east into and through Fort Mountain State Park, where the routes are also called Woody Glenn Highway. The routes climb from around 800 feet elevation to above 2,500 feet, before curving to the southeast, passing into and out of Gilmer County twice for very short portions, before finally crossing and staying in Gilmer County, and forming part of the southern border of the Chattahoochee National Forest, then descending into Ellijay. In Ellijay, the two routes cross the Ellijay River together, then SR 52 splits from SR 2 as the route first crosses the Cartecay River just north of where it and the Ellijay River combine to form the Coosawattee River.  The route then crosses SR 5/SR 515 and continues southeast, still parallel with the southern reaches of the Chattahoochee National Forest, and runs through rural portions of Gilmer County and northern Dawson County.

Just west of Amicalola Falls State Park, the route assumes an easterly routing at the junction with SR 183, and passes into Lumpkin County, soon thereafter leaving behind the Chattahoochee National Forest. To the west of Dahlonega, SR 52 becomes co-signed with SR 9, and the two routes continue east to Dahlonega, bypassing its downtown to the south and east. Shortly after a brief concurrence with US 19 and SR 60, SR 52 departs and continues east. After a brief concurrency with SR 115 southeast of Dahlonega, the route again assumes a southeasterly course and crosses into Hall County. After passing the community of Clermont to its south, and crossing US 129/SR 11, the route makes a brief turn to the northeast, then curves sharply southeast again, crosses US 23/SR 13, and passes through Lula into Banks County, forming part of the county line between Hall County and Banks County. SR 52 continues southeast through Gillsville, and heads to its eastern terminus in Maysville in Jackson County at its intersection with SR 98.

National Highway System
The following portions of SR 52 are part of the National Highway System, a system of routes determined to be the most important for the nation's economy, mobility, and defense:
From its western terminus at I-75 in Dalton to the eastern end of the US 76 and US 411/SR 61 concurrencies in Chatsworth
From US 76/SR 2/SR 5/SR 515 in East Ellijay to the eastern end of the SR 115 concurrency east of Dahlonega

Traffic
The Georgia Department of Transportation average annual daily traffic (AADT) numbers for the year 2011 show a variety of average daily traffic load numbers as the route travels across northern Georgia.  Daily vehicle averages start at the western terminus at I-75 with averages ranging from around 19,000 to a high of 27,600 vehicles per day going from I-75 into and through downtown Dalton, where the route represents the most direct route into Dalton.  Averages stay around 25,000 and see their route maximum as SR 52 becomes concurrent with US 76 in Dalton, where nearly 29,000 vehicles travel the route on a daily basis.  As the routes travel east to Chatsworth, averages come down to between 15,600 and 18,700 vehicles, and reduce further to 13,600 as the routes meet US 411.  East of Chatsworth, as SR 52 starts into the Chattahoochee National Forest, and leaves residential areas, numbers drop drastically, going from 4,600 down to a route low of 620 vehicles as the route traverses Gilmer County.

Vehicle load remains well below 1,400 until the route approaches Ellijay, where numbers climb to just above 8,000 vehicles, going to a high of 10,500 as the route crosses SR 5.  East of SR 5 the vehicle load drops quickly again down to around 2,700 vehicles as the route crosses into Dawson County, and falls further to just below 1,000 vehicles east of SR 183.  As SR 52 crosses into Lumpkin County and approaches Dahlonega, averages again increase to around 2,000 west of Dahlonega, rapidly increasing to just over 10,000 vehicles where the route is concurrent with SR 9.  Numbers again drop to around 6,000 east of US 19, then again rapidly drop to around 1,500 into Hall County.  Vehicle load increases once more around US 23 to reach 4,000 vehicles per day, drop back down to 1,000 vehicles in Banks County, and see numbers of just over 3,000 at the route's eastern terminus in Maysville.

History
The first portion of the roadway that is signed as SR 52 today makes its appearance on Georgia state road maps in 1920, when the  portion of the current route from its western terminus to Chatsworth, which is concurrent with US 76, was already in existence, and signed as part of SR2.  In 1921, a roadway designated as SR 52 is mapped - covering what today is signed as SR 28 in the Augusta area in east-central Georgia (excluding the portion of SR 28 in northeastern Georgia today).  In addition, the  portion of the current route from Dahlonega, southeast to where it intersects today with US 129, was extant and signed as SR 43 at the time.  By the beginning of 1932, the western portion of the route was extended to now feature a new  section from Chatsworth to Ellijay, also signed as SR 2.  In addition, the part of the route between Dahlonega and US 129 was improved to be covered in hard surface, and the part of the route between Dalton and Chatsworth was partially improved at the time.  By mid-1932, another major addition had been graded, namely the portion of the route between Ellijay to southwest of Dahlonega. This section was also designated as SR 43, which meant that between the portions of SR 2 and SR 43 that correspond to today's routing, the entire stretch from its western terminus to US 129 in the vicinity of Clermonth was extant.

The roadway around Augusta, which had carried the designation of SR 52, had been re-signed as SR 28 by the middle of 1938.  However, it was not until early in 1942 that the section of the route from Ellijay east to Dahlonega, and continuing to US 129, had been re-designated as SR 52, the first appearance of this designation in northwestern and northern Georgia.  In addition, a  portion of roadway had been graded and designated as part of SR 52, running southeast from US 23/SR 13 in Lula to Gillsville in Banks County.  As far as road conditions were concerned, hard surface had been added to the portion of the route between Dalton and Chatsworth, and for portions of the route west of SR 183 and west of Dahlonega.  The remaining gaps in the route were closed in 1948, when the section of the route between US 129 near Clermont, and US 23/SR 13 in Lula, was graded, and the route was extended from Gillsville to Maysville.  With the exception of the new portion between Clermonth and Lula, and small section of the route in Gilmer and Dawson counties, the route had been finished in hard surface at the time.  It was then just one more year before the portion of the route between Dalton and Ellijay was re-designated as SR 52, completing the routing and designation of this state highway.

Major intersections

Special routes

Chatsworth alternate route

State Route 52 Alternate (SR 52 Alt.) serves as an alternate route from just west of Chatsworth into the heart of the city, while the mainline takes drivers through the northern and western parts of the city. It travels from the SR 52 mainline just east of the Whitfield–Murray county line southeast to SR 225, then east into downtown Chatsworth, where it ends at the concurrency of US 76/US 411/SR 2/SR 52/SR 61. The highway also passes by the Chief Vann House Historic Site.

See also

References

External links

052
Transportation in Whitfield County, Georgia
Transportation in Murray County, Georgia
Transportation in Gilmer County, Georgia
Transportation in Dawson County, Georgia
Transportation in Lumpkin County, Georgia
Transportation in Hall County, Georgia
Transportation in Banks County, Georgia
Transportation in Jackson County, Georgia